Crassispira mekranica is an extinct species of sea snail, a marine gastropod mollusk in the family Pseudomelatomidae, the turrids and allies.

Description
The length of the shell attains 21 mm, its diameter 5.5 mm.

Distribution
Fossils have been found in Tertiary strata of Northwest India.

References

 E. Vredenburg. 1925. Description of Mollusca from the post-Eocene Tertiary formation of north-western India: Cephalopoda, Opisthobranchiata, Siphonostomata. Memoirs of the Geological Survey of India 50(1):1-350

mekranica
Gastropods described in 1925